The Cox Moore Tournament was a professional golf tournament. The event was played in 1961, 1963 and 1964 and was sponsored by Long Eaton-based Cox Moore sweaters, who elected to move their sponsorship to horse racing in 1965.

Winners

References

Golf tournaments in England
1961 establishments in England
1964 disestablishments in England